The Military ranks of Fiji are the military insignia used by the Republic of Fiji Military Forces. Being a former Crown colony, Fiji shares a rank structure similar to that of the United Kingdom.

Commissioned officer ranks
The rank insignia of commissioned officers.

Other ranks
The rank insignia of non-commissioned officers and enlisted personnel.

References

External links
 

Fiji and the Commonwealth of Nations
Fiji
Military of Fiji